Maksim Nikolayevich Gleykin (born 9 May 1985) is a Russian former professional football player.

Club career
He played in the Russian Football National League for FC Volgar-Gazprom Astrakhan in 2006.

External links
 
 

1985 births
Sportspeople from Astrakhan
Living people
Russian footballers
Association football goalkeepers
FC Volgar Astrakhan players